Seredinnoye is a rural locality (a selo) in Kakhovsky Selsoviet of Romnensky District, Amur Oblast, Russia. The population was 19 as of 2018. There is 1 street.

Geography 
Seredinnoye is located 18 km north of Romny (the district's administrative centre) by road. Kakhovka is the nearest rural locality.

References 

Rural localities in Romnensky District